Tokyo Paralympics may refer to:

 1964 Summer Paralympics
 2020 Summer Paralympics

See also 
 Tokyo bid for the 2016 Summer Paralympics
 Tokyo Olympics (disambiguation)